This is a list of the longest-reigning monarchs of all time, detailing the monarchs and lifelong leaders who have reigned the longest in world history, ranked by length of reign.

Monarchs of sovereign states with verifiable reigns by exact date 
The following are the 25 longest-reigning monarchs of states who were internationally recognized as sovereign for most or all of their reign. Byzantine emperors Constantine VIII and Basil II, reigning for 66 years in total (962–1028) and for 65 years in total (960–1025) respectively, are not included, because for part of those periods they reigned only nominally as junior co-emperors alongside senior emperors. 

Regencies are not counted against monarchs, hence Louis XIV of France being listed first among the monarchs of sovereign states despite his mother Anne of Austria being his regent for 8 years.

Monarchs of dependent or constituent states with verifiable reigns by exact date 

The table below contains 100 monarchs of states that were not internationally sovereign for most of their reign.

Monarchs whose exact dates of rule are unknown 
These monarchs are grouped according to length of reign by year in whole numbers. Within each year-grouping, they appear in historical order. In a given year, there may have been a wide array of actual reign lengths based on days. Thus, this table does not present a precise ranking by length of reign. The list is limited to those that might reasonably be expected to lie within the range of those in the tables above, at minimum 56 years. The list is sorted alphabetically.  states were sovereign. Japanese legendary emperors, according to the ancient Japanese calendar, reigned for very long terms of 60–70 years each. The longest ruler of the legendary emperors, Emperor Kōan, was claimed to have reigned for about 101 years. These figures are not included in the table because they are regarded as inaccurate by modern scholars. For those, see Longevity myths.

See also 
 List of current reigning monarchs by length of reign
 List of shortest-reigning monarchs
 List of oldest living state leaders
 Lists of state leaders by age
 Lists of state leaders
 Records of heads of state
 List of centenarians (politicians and civil servants)

Notes

References 

 
Longest-reigning monarchs
Monarchs